Friars Walk may refer to:

Friars Walk, Newport, shopping and leisure complex in Newport, South Wales
Friars Walk, Reading, a derelict shopping centre in Reading, Berkshire